John Michael Crawhall (born 21 February 1938) is a former English cricketer.  Crawhall was a right-handed batsman.  He was born in Newcastle upon Tyne, Northumberland and educated at Rugby School, where he represented the school cricket team.

Crawhall made his debut for Northumberland in the 1962 Minor Counties Championship against the Lancashire Second XI.  Crawhall played Minor counties cricket for Northumberland from 1961 to 1979, which included 164 Minor Counties Championship appearances.  He made his List A debut against Lincolnshire in the 1971 Gillette Cup.  He made 2 further List A appearances for Northumberland, against Bedfordshire and Somerset, both in the 1977 Gillette Cup.  In his 3 List A matches for the county, he scored 82 runs at an average of 41.00, with a high score of 66.  This score came against Lincolnshire in 1971.

Playing for Northumberland allowed Crawhall to appear in a four List A matches, one in the 1972 Benson & Hedges Cup against Yorkshire.  In this match, he scored 4 runs before being dismissed by Don Wilson.

References

External links
Mike Crawhall at ESPNcricinfo
Mike Crawhall at CricketArchive

1938 births
Living people
Cricketers from Newcastle upon Tyne
People educated at Rugby School
English cricketers
Northumberland cricketers
Minor Counties cricketers